The laws listed below meet the following criteria: (1) they were passed by the United States Congress, and (2) pertain to (a) the regulation of the interaction of humans and the natural environment, or (b) the conservation and/or management of natural or historic resources.  They need not be wholly codified in the United States Code.

 Antiquities Act
 Atomic Energy Act of 1946
 Atomic Energy Act of 1954
 Clean Air Act
 Clean Water Act
 Coastal Zone Management Act
 Comprehensive Environmental Response, Compensation and Liability Act (Superfund)
 Emergency Planning and Community Right-to-Know Act
 Endangered Species Act
 Energy Policy Act of 1992
 Energy Policy Act of 2005
 Federal Food, Drug, and Cosmetic Act
 Federal Land Policy and Management Act
 Federal Insecticide, Fungicide, and Rodenticide Act
 Federal Power Act
 Fish and Wildlife Coordination Act
 Food Quality Protection Act
 Fisheries Conservation and Management Act (Magnuson-Stevens)
 Lacey Act
 Marine Mammal Protection Act
 Migratory Bird Treaty Act
 Mineral Leasing Act
 National Environmental Policy Act
 National Forest Management Act
 National Historic Preservation Act
 National Park Service Organic Act
 Noise Control Act
 Nuclear Waste Policy Act
 Ocean Dumping Act
 Oil Pollution Act
 Resource Conservation and Recovery Act
 Rivers and Harbors Act
 Safe Drinking Water Act
 Surface Mining Control and Reclamation Act
 Toxic Substances Control Act
 Wild and Scenic Rivers Act
 Wilderness Act

See also
 Environmental law
 List of international environmental agreements
 List of United States energy acts
 Timeline of major U.S. environmental and occupational health regulation

External links
 List of U.S. environmental laws and treaties - Natural Resources Defense Council

Environmental statutes
Federal